Jasper Adams (born 3 July 1989) is a Dutch handball player for Limburg Lions and the Dutch national team.

He represented the Netherlands at the 2020 European Men's Handball Championship.

References

External links

1989 births
Living people
Dutch male handball players
People from Geleen
Sportspeople from Limburg (Netherlands)
Limburg Lions players